WWC is a three-letter abbreviation that may refer to:

 Warren Wilson College
 What Works Clearinghouse, an educational initiative in the U.S.
 Whitman-Walker Clinic, an HIV/AIDS medical care organization in Washington, D.C.
 Wizard World Chicago, an annual comic book convention
 Woodrow Wilson Center
 World Water Council
 World Weightlifting Championships
 World Wrestling Council, a Puerto Rican pro wrestling promotion.
 Walla Walla College, the former name of Walla Walla University
 World War Combat, a turn based strategy game
 White working class
 Woolwich railway station, given the National Rail code WWC

Women's World Cup
 FIFA Women's World Cup
 UCI Women's Road World Cup
 Women's Cricket World Cup
 Women's Rugby World Cup
 Women's Rugby League World Cup
 Women's World Cup of Golf